James Stewart (July 10, 1910 – August 12, 1990) was a Canadian basketball player, born in Kingsville, Ontario, who competed in the 1936 Summer Olympics.

He was the captain of the Canadian basketball team, which won the silver medal. He played four matches including the final.

References

External links
profile

1910 births
1990 deaths
People from Essex County, Ontario
Basketball people from Ontario
Basketball players at the 1936 Summer Olympics
Canadian men's basketball players
Olympic basketball players of Canada
Olympic medalists in basketball
Olympic silver medalists for Canada
Medalists at the 1936 Summer Olympics